A Hand of Glory is the dried and pickled hand of a man who has been hanged.

Hand of Glory may also refer to:

Music
Hand of Glory (album), a 2002 album by Royal Trux
Hands of Glory, a 2012 album by Andrew Bird
"Hand of Glory", a song by Rage on their 1986 album Reign of Fear
"Hand of Glory", a song by Strike Anywhere on their 2009 album Iron Front
"Hand of Glory", a song by The Smithereens on their 1986 album Especially for You
"Hand of Glory", a song by Witch on their 2006 eponymous album Witch
The Hand of Glory EP, a 1983 EP by Ramleh

Other uses
The Hand of Glory, a 2002 Australian novel
"Hand of Glory", a Cthulhu Mythos short story by Laird Barron
"Hand of Glory", an episode of the American television series Graceland

See also
 Dead man's hand (disambiguation)